The women's football tournament of the 2010 South Asian Games is the first ever edition of the tournament. India won gold medal with a 3–1 win over Nepal.

Group stage

 [Sri Lanka dns, preferring to  catch a return flight to Colombo]

Gold medal match

References

External links
 11th South Asian Federation Games 2010 (Bangladesh) – Women's Tournament

2010 South Asian Games
2010 South Asian Games - Men's tournament